The Breitspurbahn (translation: broad-gauge railway) was a planned  broad-gauge railway, proposed during the time of Nazi Germany, supposed to run with double-deck coaches between major cities of Grossdeutschland, Hitler's expanded Germany, and neighbouring states.

History
Since reparations due after World War I had to be paid, the German railway company Deutsche Reichsbahn lacked money for appropriate expansion and sufficient maintenance of their track network and rolling stock.

Commercial and civilian traffic increased due to economic stimulation after the rise of the NSDAP and Hitler's seizure of power. Deutsche Reichsbahn was now faced with a serious capacity problem. As a result, in part driven by its military objectives, the government began to prepare plans to modernize the railway network and increase transport capacity. Hitler believed that the standard Stephenson gauge was obsolete and was too narrow for the full development of railways.  Also, as Hitler envisioned the future German empire as essentially a land-based Empire, the new German railways were imagined as a land-based equivalent of the ocean liners and freighters connecting the maritime British Empire.

Hitler embraced a suggestion from Fritz Todt to build a new high-capacity Reichsspurbahn (Imperial Gauge Railway) with notably increased gauge. Objections from railway experts – who foresaw difficulties in introducing a new, incompatible gauge (and proposed quadruple track standard gauge lines instead), and who could not imagine any use for the vast transport capacity of such a railway – were ignored, and Hitler ordered the Breitspurbahn to be built with initial lines between Hamburg, Berlin, Nuremberg, Munich and Linz.

The project engaged commercial partners Krauss-Maffei; Henschel; Borsig;Brown, Boveri & Cie and Krupp, but did not develop beyond line planning and initial survey.  Throughout World War II, 100 officials and 80 engineers continued to work on the project.

Proposed routes

Early plans for routes considered India, Iran, Syria, Vladivostok and Canada (via Bering Strait) as the ultimate goals of the railways, but by 1943 the planning was focused exclusively on European cities. Ukraine and the Volga Basin were seen as especially important targets, as these areas were viewed as the future granaries of Greater Germany, potentially through the "settlement strings", or Siedlungsperlen of the proposed Wehrbauer settlements within the conquered territories, which would also be linked by the planned easternmost reaches of the Reichsautobahn freeway network. Due to mountainous terrain, the initial phase routes of Aachen-Paris and Budapest-Bucharest were drawn via Antwerp instead of Liège, and via Belgrade instead of the Hungary/Romania border respectively.

East-West: Rostov - Donetsk - Poltava - Kyiv - Lviv - Kraków - Katowice - Wrocław - Cottbus - Welthauptstadt Germania (Berlin) - Hanover - Bielefeld - Ruhrgebiet - Aachen - Liège - Saint-Quentin - Paris
Initially proposed the Flemish corridor as Aachen - Antwerp - Ghent - Paris
North-Southeast: Hamburg - Wittenberge - Welthauptstadt Germania (Berlin) - Leipzig - Gotha - Bamberg - Nuremberg - Munich - Simbach am Inn - Linz - Vienna - Presburg - Budapest - Bucharest - Varna/Burgas - Istanbul
Initially proposed the Serbian corridor as Budapest - Belgrade - Bucharest
North-South-Parallel: Welthauptstadt Germania (Berlin) - Dresden - Aussig - Prague - Iglau - Znaim - Vienna - Trieste - Rome
East-West 2: Munich - Augsburg - Stuttgart - Karlsruhe - Metz - Reims - Paris - Marseille - Barcelona - Madrid

For further routes, see German version and Dutch version.

Tracks 

Planning called for a ballastless track (much as was developed 30 years later for San Francisco BART and 40 years later for German high-speed lines) which consisted of two parallel pre-stressed concrete "walls" sunk into the ground, joined at the top by a flat transverse slab. The rails were fixed on top of the "walls", with an elastic material between rail and concrete. Because it did not have conventional railway sleepers, this track would also have formed an ideal road for maintenance and military purposes. The passing loop length would be more than a mile (1 km).

The intended Russian territory included within Hitler's Lebensraum (sub-Breitspurbahn system) plans had been using the slightly wider  and  Russian gauge since the mid-19th century, barely half the width of the 3-meter gauge that was eventually chosen.

Vehicles

Locomotives
Forty-one different locomotive designs were suggested by the industry partners. These ranged from classical steam locomotives through steam turbine, gas turbine-electric and diesel-hydraulic to electric locomotives. The designs ranged from 12 axles (UIC: 3′Fo3′, Whyte: 6-12-6) to 52 axles (UIC:  2′Fo′Fo′2′ + 5T5 + 5T5 + 2′Fo′Fo′2′, Whyte: 4-12-12-4 + 10-10 + 10-10 + 4-12-12-4). All locomotives would have automatic couplers, ranged from Janney couplers to SA3 couplers. Several designs were short listed with passenger locomotives to be mainly electric and diesel-hydraulic with SA3 couplers, and freight locomotives to be mainly conventional steam with Janney couplers.

Multiple units
Diesel and electric multiple units of between five and eight coaches were proposed for shorter distance journeys. Despite being of somewhat lower standard, proposed designs included promenades, bars, lounges and large dining rooms.

Carriages
The carriages would have Dutch doors (with retractable staircase). The trains would be fitted with a restaurant, theatre, swimming pool, barbershop and sauna. Designs included:

 1st/2nd class day car: 48 first class seats in 12 compartments, 144 second class seats in 24 compartments, bar, lounge, reading room, luggage compartments, 12 toilets.
 3rd class day car: 460 seats in 56 compartments, lounge, 12 toilets.
 1st/2nd class dining car: 130 seats at 24 tables, kitchen, pantry.
 3rd class day car with dining room: 244 seats in 28 compartments, 176 seat dining room, kitchen, pantry.
 1st/2nd class sleeping car: 16 first class beds in 16 cabins, 41 second class beds in 19 cabins, breakfast room, kitchen, washrooms, 10 toilets.
 2nd class sleeping car: 104 beds in 104 cabins, washrooms, 12 toilets.
 3rd class sleeping car: 264 beds in 44 cabins, breakfast room, kitchen, shower rooms, 10 toilets.
 Day/night car for Ost-Arbeiter: 480 seats in 52 cabins, kitchen, washrooms, staff room.
 Theatre car: 196-seat theatre.
 Observation car: 16 first class seats in four compartments, 32 second class seats in eight compartments, 160 third class seats in 20 compartments, galley, cold buffet, bar, observation deck.
 Mail car: mail storage and sorting, parcel space, crew room, space for 6 automobiles, dog kennels.
 Baggage car: baggage rooms, space for two automobiles, dog kennels, canteen, crew room, multiple 20 mm anti-aircraft guns, ammunition storage and gun crews.

Successors & similar plans
Most passenger carriages would have Dutch doors (with retractable staircase), with some exceptions being low-level-boarding-only designs.

In fiction
A ride on Breitspurbahn is featured in Wolfenstein: The New Order video game. The railway network is also mentioned in novels Fatherland and The Fuhrer's Orphans.

An American version of the Breitspurbahn is depicted in the TV series Supertrain.

In the television series Snowpiercer (TV series), the titular train bears many similarities to the Breitspurbahn.

An upcoming Trainz content called Project Germania based on the Breitspurbahn, going to be released sometime in 2023.

See also

Nazi Germany
Welthauptstadt Germania
Eurasian Land Bridge
Bering Strait crossing
Broad gauge
Dual gauge
Great Western Railway (Isambard Kingdom Brunel)
Train on Train
Trans-Asian Railway
Transcontinental railway
Bilevel rail car

References

Further reading 
 Die Breitspurbahn, Anton Joachimsthaler.  Herbig, 1996. 
 Broader than Broad: Hitler's Great Dream: Three Meter Gauge Rails Across Europe, Barnes, Robin. Locomotives International. 1998.

External links

 Breitspurbahn.de Pictures of the "Breitspurbahn"
 epilog.de Concept drawings and discussion of the Breitspurbahn

Abandoned projects of Nazi Germany
Rail infrastructure in Germany
3000 mm gauge railways
4000 mm gauge railways
Track gauges
Track gauges by name
Standards of Germany